Stonehooking was a method of gathering stone slabs from the shallow lake shore in Southern Ontario destined primarily for building construction.  It flourished as an industry from the mid-nineteenth century to the early twentieth century until the use of portland cement supplanted it as a building material.

Stonehooking was done in Lake Ontario from Whitby to Bronte.  Stonehooking fleets were found at ports in Frenchman's Bay, Port Credit, Oakville, and Bronte.  During the heyday of the stonehooking industry, twenty-three schooners operated out of Port Credit.  In Toronto Harbour, an estimated  was removed by the industry.

Specialised schooners known as stonehookers would anchor close to shore.  A barge would be sent out to gather the stone.  This was accomplished using long rakes with hooks at the end to pry up slabs of stone which would be piled on the barge.  The stone would then be loaded on the schooner's deck until full.

References

External links
 Image of stonehooking off Bronte

History of Ontario